Oakville is a census-designated place (CDP) and neighborhood section of Watertown, in Litchfield County, Connecticut, United States. The population was 9,047 as of the 2010 census. It is the most populous community in Watertown, with more than twice as many people as the center village of Watertown. The ZIP code for Oakville is 06779.

Geography
Oakville is in the southeast part of Watertown. It is bordered to the northwest by the village of Watertown and to the south by the city of Waterbury. The Connecticut Route 8 freeway forms the eastern edge of Oakville, with access from a half-exit at Connecticut Route 262.

Steele Brook, a tributary of the Naugatuck River, flows through Oakville, with a dam in the center of town forming Pin Shop Pond.

Demographics
As of the census of 2000, there were 8,618 people, 3,255 households, and 2,369 families residing in the CDP.  The population density was 1,053.0/km (2,726.7/mi2).  There were 3,358 housing units at an average density of 410.3/km (1,062.5/mi2).  The racial makeup of the CDP was 95.72% White, 1.17% African American, 0.08% Native American, 1.13% Asian, 0.02% Pacific Islander, 0.64% from other races, and 1.24% from two or more races. Hispanic or Latino of any race were 2.82% of the population.

There were 3,255 households, out of which 33.7% had children under the age of 18 living with them, 58.0% were married couples living together, 10.8% had a female householder with no husband present, and 27.2% were non-families. Of all households 23.2% were made up of individuals, and 10.0% had someone living alone who was 65 years of age or older.  The average household size was 2.64 and the average family size was 3.13.

In the community, the population was spread out, with 24.8% under the age of 18, 6.8% from 18 to 24, 31.6% from 25 to 44, 23.0% from 45 to 64, and 13.8% who were 65 years of age or older.  The median age was 38 years. For every 100 females, there were 90.8 males.  For every 100 females age 18 and over, there were 90.9 males.

The median income for a household in the CDP was $48,395, and the median income for a family was $59,417. Males had a median income of $41,993 versus $29,055 for females. The per capita income for the CDP was $20,763.  About 1.6% of families and 3.2% of the population were below the poverty line, including 1.0% of those under age 18 and 5.7% of those age 65 or over.

Local media
 Waterbury Republican-American, a Waterbury-based independent daily newspaper
 Town Times, Prime Publishers Inc., a local newspaper serving Watertown, Oakville, Bunker Hill in Waterbury, Thomaston and Northfield. Voices, its sister paper, covers Southbury, Middlebury, Oxford, Seymour, Naugatuck, Woodbury, Bethelhem, New Preston, Washington, Washington Depot, Roxbury, Bridgewater, Monroe, Sandy Hook and Newtown
 Macaroni Kid, an online magazine for families in Watertown

References

External links
 Town of Watertown official website

Census-designated places in Connecticut
Census-designated places in Litchfield County, Connecticut
Neighborhoods in Connecticut
Watertown, Connecticut